Józefa Maria Hennelowa (1 April 1925 – 22 August 2020) was a Polish publicist, journalist, columnist, Catholic intellectual, and politician. As a journalist, she spent more than seven decades as a reporter and editor at Tygodnik Powszechny, a Catholic weekly newspaper headquartered in Krakow. Hennelowa also served in the Sejm, the lower house of the Parliament of Poland, from 1989 until 1993 during the country's transition from communism to democracy.

Biography
Józefa Hennelowa was born Józefa Maria Golmont on 1 April 1925 in Vilnius, Poland (modern-day Lithuania), to an ethnic Polish family.  Her father was a tailor who created cassocks for Catholic clergy. She originally wanted to be a violinist, rather than a journalist, and became interested in Juliusz Osterwa's life and career while studying in Krakow. During World War II, she joined the women's wing of the Gray Ranks, an underground resistance group opposed to the German occupation, and secretly taught in Vilnius. Following the war and the incorporation of Vilnius into the Soviet Union, Hennelowa moved to the new post-war Poland. She was a graduate of Jagiellonian University in Krakow.

She worked as the Institute of Nuclear Physics Polish Academy of Sciences in Krakow from 1954 to 1956 and then the Krakow office of the Ossolineum.

Hennelowa joined the Klub Inteligencji Katolickiej, or Club of Catholic Intelligentsia, in 1956. She also became involved with the Association of Polish Journalists.

Hennelowa first joined the staff of Tygodnik Powszechny, a Catholic weekly published in Krakow, as a proofreader in 1948. She rose over her career to become a reporter, then the newspaper's editor, and secretary of the editorial office. From 1982 until 2012, Hennelowa published a series of regular columns and opinion pieces, including "Widziane z Domu", "Z Domu i not Only", "Votum separatum", and "Na marginesie." She remained deputy editor-in-chief until 2008.

In 1984, Father Jerzy Popiełuszko, a Catholic priest associated with Solidarity, was assassinated by agents from the Ministry of Public Security, the country's secret police. Hennelowa covered the murder trial for Tygodnik Powszechny, though state censors made her work difficult.

In 1989, as Communist rule began to wane, Hennelowa and her husband, joined the Citizens' Movement for Democratic Action (ROAD), a short-lived political party. Hennelowa was elected to the Contract Sejm, the transitional parliament, in 1989 as a ROAD candidate, serving her first term from 1989 to 1991. When ROAD split, she and her faction joined Tadeusz Mazowiecki's new Democratic Union (UD), where she became one the party's founding members in 1990. As a UD member, Hennelowa was re-elected to the Sejm in 1991, where she served until 1993. Hennelowa later became a member of the Freedom Union from 1994 to 1999.

She ran afoul of some in the Polish political right-wing, who falsely accused her of being pro-abortion. Hennelowa, however, was anti-abortion, but she also strongly opposed punishments for women who chose to undergo an abortion.

She was the author of numerous books and publications, many of which focused on Catholicism. She also co-authored a biography of actor Juliusz Osterwa, which she wrote with Jerzy Szaniawski.

For her work, Hennelova was awarded the Commander's Cross of the Order of Polonia Restituta and the Order of St. Gregory the Great, one of the Vatican's highest honors, which was presented to her by Cardinal Stanisław Dziwisz.

Józefa Hennelowa died on 22 August 2020 at the age of 95. Her husband, a physics professor, died in 2014. The couple had three children: Agnieszka (born 1955), Teresa (born 1956), and Franciszek (born 1962).

Orders and decorations
Cross of Merit (1974)
Commander's Cross of the Order of Polonia Restituta (2000)
 (2001)
 (June 2012)
 (2014)
Order of St. Gregory the Great - Vatican (2015)

See also
List of Jagiellonian University people

References

1925 births
2020 deaths
20th-century Polish journalists
Polish women journalists
Polish columnists
Polish women columnists
Polish newspaper editors
Members of the Polish Sejm 1991–1993
Members of the Contract Sejm
Women members of the Sejm of the Republic of Poland
Polish women writers
Democratic Union (Poland) politicians
Freedom Union (Poland) politicians
Recipients of the Cross of Merit (Poland)
Dames of St. Gregory the Great
Commanders of the Order of Polonia Restituta
Jagiellonian University alumni
Politicians from Vilnius
Journalists from Kraków
Journalists from Vilnius
Burials at Rakowicki Cemetery